Re-Covered is the third studio album from singer, songwriter, producer, and multi-instrumentalist Dan Wilson, released on August 4, 2017 via Ballroom Music and Big Deal Media.

Background and composition
Re-Covered is a collection of reinterpretations of songs Wilson wrote for other artists including Adele, Dixie Chicks, Chris Stapleton, Taylor Swift, and more.

Reception 
The album was met with resoundingly positive reception from critics seeing coverage in The Associated Press, Rolling Stone, Billboard, Stereogum, ABC News, LA Weekly, Salon, Los Angeles Times, The Washington Post, Variety, New York Daily News, and more. The album was announced on June 1, 2017 in an interview with Zane Lowe on Apple's Beats1 Radio alongside the worldwide premiere of pre-release track "Someone Like You," which Wilson co-wrote with Adele. Kronos Quartet is featured on Wilson's Re-Covered version of the song.

Track listing

Personnel

Performers and musicians

Dan Wilson – lead vocals, guitars, piano
Mike Viola – guitars, vocals 
Jake Sinclair – bass
Pete Thomas – drums, percussion
Daniel Clarke – keyboards
Kronos Quartet: 
Brad Gordon – piano, pump organ, horns, Wurlitzer piano 
Sean Watkins – guitars 
Jacob Slichter – string arrangement 

Production

Produced by Mike Viola and Dan Wilson
Recorded by Jake Sinclair and John Rausch
Mixed by Jake Sinclair
Mastered by Richard Dodd
John Sinclair recorded and mixed "All Will Be Well", "Someone Like You", and "Closing Time" 
John Rausch recorded "Your Misfortune" and "When The Stars Come Out" 
Charlie Stavish mixed "Your Misfortune" and "When The Stars Come Out" 
Kronos Quartet recorded by Scott Fraser 
Brian W. Brundage – additional recording

Design
Art Director: Dave Bett
Photos: Noah Lamberth
Cover art, illustrations, lettering, and font by Dan Wilson

References

2017 albums
Dan Wilson (musician) albums
Albums produced by Dan Wilson (musician)
Big Deal Music albums
Albums produced by Mike Viola